Krzysztof Maksel (born 4 July 1991) is a Polish professional racing cyclist. He rode at the 2015 UCI Track Cycling World Championships.

References

External links

1991 births
Living people
Polish male cyclists
People from Nysa County
Sportspeople from Opole Voivodeship
Olympic cyclists of Poland
Cyclists at the 2016 Summer Olympics
Cyclists at the 2019 European Games
Cyclists at the 2020 Summer Olympics
European Games medalists in cycling
European Games bronze medalists for Poland